John Jeirus Barnett  (December 16, 1879 – September 3, 1923) was a professional baseball player who played outfielder in the major leagues for the 1907 St. Louis Cardinals. He died after being accidentally shot while hunting.

References

External links

1879 births
1923 deaths
Major League Baseball outfielders
Baseball players from California
Accidental deaths in California
St. Louis Cardinals players
Tacoma Tigers players
Spokane Indians players
Montgomery Climbers players
Saginaw Krazy Kats players
Binghamton Bingoes players
Scranton Miners players
Springfield Hampdens players
Deaths by firearm in California
Firearm accident victims in the United States
Hunting accident deaths